Katra  Assembly constituency is one  of the 403 constituencies of the Tilhar Uttar Pradesh Legislative Assembly,  India. It is a part of the Shahjahanpur  district and one of the five assembly constituencies in the Shahjahanpur Lok Sabha constituency. First election in this assembly constituency was  held in 2012 after the "Delimitation of Parliamentary Tilhar and Assembly  Constituencies Order, 2008" was passed and the constituency was formed  in 2008. The constituency is assigned identification number 131.

Wards  / Areas
Extent of Katra Assembly constituency is KCs Kheda Bajheda, Jalalpur, Katra,  Khudaganj NP, Katra NP of Tilhar Tehsil & KC Paraur of Jalalabad  Tehsil.

Members of the Legislative Assembly

Election results

2022

2012
16th Vidhan Sabha: 2012 General  Elections

See also
Tilhar Assembly constituency
Shahjahanpur district
Shahjahanpur Lok Sabha constituency
Sixteenth Legislative Assembly of Uttar Pradesh
Uttar Pradesh Legislative Assembly
Vidhan Bhawan

References

External links
 

Shahjahanpur district
Assembly constituencies of Uttar Pradesh
Constituencies established in 2008